Laitkor Lumheh is a village located in the East Khasi Hills district, Meghalaya, India. As per 2011 Census of India, Laitkor Lumheh has a population of 4,146 people with a literacy rate of 87.42%.

References 

Villages in East Khasi Hills district